Francesco Brevio (died 1508) was a Roman Catholic prelate who served as Bishop of Ceneda (1498–1508).

Biography
On 19 Jan 1498, Francesco Brevio was appointed during the papacy of Pope Alexander VI as Bishop of Ceneda.
He served as Bishop of Ceneda until his death on 7 Aug 1508.

References

External links and additional sources
 (for Chronology of Bishops) 
 (for Chronology of Bishops) 

15th-century Roman Catholic bishops in the Republic of Venice
16th-century Roman Catholic bishops in the Republic of Venice
Bishops appointed by Pope Alexander VI
1508 deaths
15th-century Italian jurists
16th-century Italian jurists